Mary Robb may refer to:

 Mary Anne Robb (1829–1912), English botanist
 Mary Lee Robb (1926–2006), American radio actress during the 1940s and 1950s